Miss Turkey is a national beauty pageant in Turkey. The pageant was founded in 1929, where the winners titled as Miss Turkey Universe, Miss Turkey World and Miss Turkey Supranational.

History
Miss Turkey pageant was initially promoted by the newspaper Cumhuriyet. Since 1980, it has been run by the "Miss Turkey Organization".

Between the years 1980–1990, the contest was sponsored by the newspapers Güneş, Sabah, Tercüman, Bulvar, and some others.

Broadcasts
With the establishment of private TV channels in Turkey in 1990, the channels Magic Box, Show TV, Channel D, Star TV, NTV, CNBC-e and FOX TV took over the promotion of the pageant.

The title "Miss Turkey" is a registered trademark.

National franchise holders
The main winner of Miss Turkey goes to Miss World. The Miss Turkey Organization also crowns delegates to Miss Universe, Miss International, and Miss Supranational beauty pageants.

International winners
Note: Not all winners are determined by the current Miss Turkey Organization.

- Miss World
 2002: Azra Akın

- Miss Top Model of the World
 2001: Yeliz Celiskan
 2003: Nihan Akkuş

- Miss Intercontinental
 1999: Mine Erbaykent

- Miss Asia Pacific
 1979: Ayla Atlas
 1984: Melek Gurkan
 1998: Arzu Albayrak

- Miss Europe
 1952: Günseli Başar
 1971: Filiz Vural
 1982: Nazlı Deniz Kuruoğlu
 1984: Neşe Erberk
 1993: Arzum Onan

- Miss Universe
 1932: Keriman Halis Ece

Unsuccessful attempts to participate
(DNC) = Did not compete

(*) The Miss Universe-delegate during the year 2000, Cansu Dere, was forbidden by the Turkish Government to travel to the 2000 Miss Universe pageant, in Cyprus, unless she could pass through Northern Cyprus, which was then forbidden for any visitor to the Republic of Cyprus. The competition committee in Turkey made arrangements for her to travel through Athens, but the day before her departure the government refused to let her go, "for political reasons". This was the second delegate that was not allowed to represent Turkey that year. 

(*) Ahu Ağırbaş who was crowned Miss Turkey/International 2013 did not compete, due to maximum age recruitment.

(**) Competition was arranged after the deadline of the Miss Universe pageant, and the competition committee could not send a delegate. The delegate who was supposed to enter the Miss Universe pageant, competed the following year instead.

Titleholders

1929-1991

 Winner International Title
 Miss Turkey Universe
 Miss Turkey World
 Miss Turkey International
 Miss Turkey Europe

1992–2016

2017–present

Representatives to international beauty pageants
Miss Turkey sends representatives to the Big Four, the world's four most important beauty contest. Traditionally, the major titleholders of Miss Turkey represent the country at the Miss Universe, Miss World and Miss Supranational and other titles might go to Miss International and Miss Earth pageants.

Miss Turkey Universe

On some occasions, the winner of Miss Turkey Universe represents her country at the Miss Universe.

Miss Turkey World

On some occasions, the winner of Miss Turkey World represents her country at the Miss World.

Miss Turkey Supranational

On some occasions, the winner of Miss Turkey Supranational represents her country at the Miss Supranational.

References

External links

 
 Miss Globe official website
 Miss Turkey official website

 
Beauty pageants in Turkey
Annual events in Turkey
Turkey
Turkey
Turkey
Turkey
1929 establishments in Turkey
Recurring events established in 1929
Turkish awards